Almansouria is a town in Ben Slimane Province, Casablanca-Settat, Morocco. According to the 2004 census it had a population of 12,955.

References

Populated places in Benslimane Province
Municipalities of Morocco